Ben Kennedy may refer to:

 Ben Kennedy (rugby league) (born 1974), Australian former rugby league footballer
 Ben Kennedy (Australian rules footballer), (born 1994), Australian footballer for Melbourne
 Ben Kennedy (soccer, born 1987), Australian football (soccer) goalkeeper
 Ben Kennedy (footballer, born 1997), Northern Irish professional football player
 Ben Kennedy (racing driver) (born 1991), American stock car racing driver
 Benjamin Hall Kennedy (1804–1889), English scholar